Samastha Kerala Jem-iyyathul Ulama,–present, is the principal Sunni-Shafi'i scholarly body in Kerala. The council administers Shafi'ite mosques, institutes of higher religious learning (the equivalent of north Indian madrasas) and madrasas (institutions where children receive basic Islamic education) in india. 

A forty-member 'mushawara' is the high command body of the Sunni council. It is currently headed by the President Sayed Jifri Muthukkoya Thangal.

Structure 

 President —  Sayed Jifri Muthukkoya Thangal
 General Secretary — K. Ali Kutty Musliyar

Wings 

 Mahallu federation —  Samastha Kerala Sunni Mahallu Federation (S. M. F.) 
 Educational board  —  Samastha Kerala Islam Matha Vidhyabhyasa Board (S. K. I. M. V. B.) 
 Madrasa teachers association —   Samastha Kerala Jem-iyyathul Muallimeen 
 Youth wing —  Sunni Yuvajana Sangham (S. Y. S.) 
 Student wing — Samastha Kerala Sunni Students' Federation (S. K. S. S. F) 
 Children's wing — Samastha Kerala Sunni Balavedhi (S. K. S. B. V.) 
 Mouthpiece (daily) — Suprabhatham

See also
 Samastha Kerala Jem-iyyathul Ulama (1926–1989)

References 

Islam in Kerala
Sunni Islam in India